Zhou Heping (born Hebei Province, China 1949) is the Honorary Director of the National Library of China.

Career
 January 2014- : Honorary Director, National Library of China
 December 2009-January 2014: Director-General, National Library of China
 March 2001-February 2010: Vice-Minister of Culture, People's Republic of China
 January 1995-November 2001: Executive Deputy Director, National Library of China

Titles in professional organizations
 April 2010-January 2014 : Director of the National Center for Ancient Book Preservation
 July 2006- : Honorary Chairman of the Library Society of China

1949 births
Living people
Chinese librarians